This is a chronological list of international declarations, declarations of independence, declarations of war, etc.



1300-1599

1600-1699

1700-1799

1800-1899

1900-1999

2000-current

Footnotes

References

International law